Diyarbakır is a city in Turkey.

Diyarbakır may also refer to:
Diyar Bakr, a historical province
Diyarbakır Airport, an airport in Turkey
Diyarbakır Archaeological Museum, a museum in Turkey
Diyarbakır Fortress, a historic fortress in Sur, Turkey
Diyarbakır oil field, an oilfield in Turkey
Diyarbakır Prison, a prison in Turkey
Diyarbakır Province, a province of Turkey
Diyarbakır railway station, a railway station in Turkey
Diyarbakır Stadium, a stadium in Turkey